is a Japanese gag comedy manga series written by Yū Yūki and illustrated by Sō and serialized on Shōnen Gahōsha's Young King magazine. It was adapted into an original net animation that premiered in Febr

The Ryō family's father, always work with Asuna and having a doctor-

8 years old first daughter of Ryō's family. A dark brown hair girl, she has a mature of love and having a strong fe

A 16 years old girl and the second daughter of Ryō's family, she has a short-length black hair. She is very shy and introverted in nature, and fights this by cosplaying.

The Kanogashi's family grandfather, he revealed to be 50 years older than Asuna, and something of a dirty old man.

The Ryō family's mother, she has a long dark purple and wears a cherry blossom hair clip at the right side of her hair. She is passionate, similar to Asuna. She is the one who makes the clinic's white nurse uniform and the doctor's coat for Ryō.

Media

Manga
Comical Psychosomatic Medicine first began as a web manga written by psychiatrist Yū Yūki and illustrated by Sō. The web manga is irregularly serialized in Yū Mental Clinic's website which started in 2009. The manga is also serialized on Shōnen Gahōsha's Young King magazine in May 2010.

Anime
An anime adaptation is produced by Shin-Ei Animation (under the name For All) and directed by Hirofumi Ogura. The original net animation series  started to stream in Japan on February 13, 2015 with about five minutes per episode.

Episode list

Other Media
A drama CD was released along with the seventh volume of the manga.

Reception

Manga

Sales

References

External-links
Anime official website 

2000s webcomics
2015 anime ONAs
Comedy anime and manga
Japanese audio dramas
Japanese comedy webcomics
Medical anime and manga
Seinen manga
Shin-Ei Animation
Shōnen Gahōsha manga
Webcomics in print